The United States Marine Modeling and Analysis Branch (MMAB) is part of the Environmental Modeling Center, which is responsible for the development of improved numerical weather and marine prediction modeling systems within NCEP/NWS. It provides analysis and real-time forecast guidance (1–16 days) on marine meteorological, oceanographic, and  cryospheric parameters over the global oceans and coastal areas of the US.

Products include:

 Ocean Waves
 Sea ice
 Marine Meteorology
        Marine Winds - Satellite Remote Sensing
        Coastal Ocean Visibility
        Open Ocean Visibility
        Vessel Icing
    Sea surface temperature
    Real-Time Ocean Forecast System

External links
 http://polar.ncep.noaa.gov/

National Weather Service
Environment of the United States